Valu Home Centers is a privately owned regional home improvement and household hardware chain based in Buffalo, New York; established in 1968. They have 33 stores located in New York and Northwestern Pennsylvania. Their first store was located on Clinton Street and South Rossler Avenue in Cheektowaga, Buffalo, which is where they are currently headquartered. They sell such things as plumbing, flooring, electrical and lawn and garden goods. Since 2000, Valu Home Centers has raised over $373,000 for their "Make A Change" program benefitting Kids Escaping Drugs. $3,716,795 for Habitat for Humanity.
According to Indeed.com, they employ nearly 900 associates and have revenue over $100 million,

References

Home improvement retailers of the United States
American companies established in 1968
Retail companies established in 1968
Hardware stores of the United States